Raffaele Calabria (11 December 1906–24 May 1982) was an Italian Catholic bishop. During his career, he served as Archbishop of Otranto and Archbishop of Benevento.

Biography 
Raffaele Calabria was born on 11 December 1906 in the town of Lucera in Apulia, Italy. He studied at the Pontifical Gregorian University and received his degree in philosophy and theology, subjects he later taught in Salerno.

He was ordained a priest on 16 March 1929 and then consecrated a bishop on 29 June 1950, when he was appointed the Titular Archbishop of Soterioupolis on 6 May 1950, which he held until 10 July 1952. Calabria was then appointed the Metropolitan Archbishop of Otranto on 10 July 1952, a position he held until 12 July 1960. Upon resigning as Archbishop of Otranto, he was made the Titular Archbishop of Heliopolis in Phoenicia on 12 July 1960, which he held until 1 January 1962. Finally, on the same date, Calabria was appointed Metropolitan Archbishop of Benevento. He held this title until 24 May 1982, when he resigned from pastoral governance.

Calabria was a participant in the Second Vatican Council, where he sided with more conservative positions. At the end of the council, he became engaged in a spirited debate with future Cardinal Yves Congar about modernism.

Calabria was also responsible for renovating the Benevento Cathedral, including the large organ and the Stations of the Cross.

On 24 May 1982, Raffaele Calabria died in Benevento at the age of 75.

References

External links 
 Archdiocese of Benevento
 Archdiocese of Otranto

1906 births
1982 deaths
People from Lucera
Archbishops of Benevento
20th-century Italian Roman Catholic titular archbishops
Pontifical Gregorian University alumni